Gianluca Firmo (Born 1 August 1973) is an Italian songwriter, keyboard player and singer.
Born in Brescia in 1973, he is the main guitar player and songwriter on Room Experience, an international melodic rock project featuring David Readman on vocals and many other star musicians of the melodic rock scene as guests.

Musician career
Gianluca learned how to play piano during his youth, but as he grew older he chose to focus more on songwriting.
While moving his first steps into music, he worked with some musicians in his own area to start bringing his songs to life.

In 2013 he met Davide Barbieri and Pierpaolo Monti and decided to give birth to an international melodic rock project called Room Experience, based on his own songs and featuring David Readman (Pink Cream 69, Voodoo Circle) on vocals, as well as many other guest musicians from the European AOR/Melodic hard rock scene.
The debut album (released worldwide in 2015 by the Australian label Melodic Rock Records, run by rock renowned journalist Andrew McNeice and distributed by Cargo Records UK) has been acclaimed  as one of the top album of the year by many sites and magazines.

In 2015, he was recruited by the producers Pierpaolo Monti and Davide Barbieri to be part of the I.F.O.R project;  he co-wrote lyrics and sang the melodic rock anthem "We Still Rock", along with some of the most important name of the Italian rock and AOR scene (I.F.O.R. stands for Italian Forces of Rock). The single has been released by Tanzan Music, only in digital format. The same year, "Tomorrows Came", taken from Room Experience album, was included in MRCD13 "Melodic Peak", the collectors compilation, released by Melodic Rock Records.

In 2016 Room Experience debut album has been released in Japan by Anderstein Music.

In 2016, once again, he contributed as songwriter to Raintimes, an international band led by Pierpaolo Monti and Davide Barbieri, featuring Micheal Shotton (Von Groove, L.R.S.) on vocals, Sven Larsson and Ivan Gonzalez on guitars and Andrea Gipponi on bass.
In 2017 Frontiers Records released "A world of fools", the third album by Lionville, where he penned the title track and "Bring me back our love", along with Bruce Gaitsch. 
He's currently working on the follow up of Room Experience, as announced in the official social page of the project.

Discography

Albums
 2015 -  Room Experience (Melodic Rock Records)
 2016 -  Room Experience Japanese Edition (Anderstein Music)

Singles
 2015 - I.F.O.R. - "We Still Rock" (D. Zublena - P. Monti - D. Barbieri - G. Firmo)

Various artists compilations
 MRCD13 - Peak Melodic 2015 (Melodic Rock Records)
 2016 -  We Still Rock -  The compilation  (Tanzan Music)

Songwriting contribution
 2017 -  A World of Fools  - Lionville (Frontiers Records)
 2017 -  Raintimes  - Raintimes (Frontiers Records)

References

Italian  male songwriters
Italian keyboardists
Living people
1973 births
21st-century Italian male  singers